Lomax is a neighborhood of La Porte, a city in Harris County, Texas, United States. Lomax once was a separate community.

The community was named after R.A. Lomax, a native of Illinois who went to the area in 1885 and donated land for a school.

Lomax incorporated in 1952 and became a city in 1966. In 1980 it was merged into the city of La Porte.

Education

Like all areas of La Porte, Lomax is in the La Porte Independent School District.

Residents are zoned to the following schools; all of them are in La Porte:
 Lomax Elementary School
 Baker Sixth Grade Campus
 Lomax Junior High School
 La Porte High School

External links

 

Former cities in Texas
La Porte, Texas
Galveston Bay Area
Greater Houston
Populated places disestablished in 1980
Geography of Harris County, Texas